The 1977–78 Yale Bulldogs men's basketball team represented Yale University during the 1977–78 men's college basketball season. The Bulldogs, led by 3rd year head coach Ray Carazo, played their home games at John J. Lee Amphitheater of the Payne Whitney Gymnasium and were members of the Ivy League. They finished the season 8–16, 3–11 in Ivy League play to finish in seventh place.

Schedule

References 

Yale Bulldogs men's basketball seasons
Yale
Yale Bulldogs
Yale Bulldogs